The 2020 season saw Western Storm compete in the new 50 over Rachael Heyhoe Flint Trophy following reforms to the structure of women's domestic cricket in England. The side finished second in the South Group of the competition, winning 4 of their 6 games, failing to progress to the final.

After the ending of the Women's Cricket Super League in 2019, the ECB announced the beginning of a new "women's elite domestic structure". Eight teams were included in this new structure, with Western Storm being one of two teams that had their brand retained as a domestic regional hub. Due to the impact of the COVID-19 pandemic, only the Rachael Heyhoe Flint Trophy was able to take place. Western Storm were captained by Sophie Luff and coached by Mark O'Leary, and played all of their home matches at the County Ground, Bristol.

Squad
Western Storm confirmed their full 17-player squad for the season on 28 August 2020. Age given is at the start of Western Storm's first match of the season (29 August 2020).

Rachael Heyhoe Flint Trophy

South Group

 Advanced to the Final.

Fixtures

Statistics

Batting

Bowling

Fielding

Wicket-keeping

References

Western Storm seasons
2020 in English women's cricket